Hovea graniticola is a species of flowering plant in the family Fabaceae and is endemic to eastern Australia. It is a shrub with its branchlets covered with curly brownish to grey hairs, narrowly oblong to almost linear leaves with stipules at the base, and mauve, pea-like flowers.

Description
The edges of the leaves are turned down or rolled under and arched on both sides of the midvein. The upper surface of the leaves is glabrous and the lower surface is densely covered with curly orangish hairs and longer spreading hairs.

Taxonomy and naming
Hovea graniticola was first formally described in 2001 by Ian R. Thompson in Australian Systematic Botany from specimens collected by James Henderson Ross  near Jollys Falls, west of The Summit in 1986. The specific epithet (graniticola) means "granite-dwelling".

Distribution and habitat
This species of pea grows in forest on soil derived from granite, from south-east Queensland to near Tamworth in New South Wales.

References

graniticola
Flora of New South Wales
Fabales of Australia
Plants described in 2001